Christine, Baroness Van den Wyngaert (born 2 April 1952) is a Belgian jurist and judge. She served as international and comparative criminal law expert from 2009 to 2018 as a judge on the International Criminal Court. She served in the Trial Division Chamber. On 8 July 2013, Van den Wyngaert was ennobled by King Albert II of Belgium as a baroness for her services as a judge. From 2003 to 2005 she was a Judge at the International Criminal Tribunal for the former Yugoslavia, and from 2000 to 2002 an ad hoc judge on the International Court of Justice.

Career

Early career
1974: Law degree from Vrije Universiteit Brussel, Belgium;
1970s: Alternative career as singer-songwriter, performing (among others) with Ferre Grignard and Wannes Van de Velde, and resulting in a Long Play recording;
1979: PhD in law, University of Brussels, Belgium;
1980: PhD thesis awarded with the Henri Rolin-prize;
From 1985: Professor criminal law at the University of Antwerp;
Visiting Fellow of the Centre for European Legal Studies (1994–1996) and of the Research Centre for International Law (1996–1997) at the University of Cambridge;
2001: Visiting professor at the University of Stellenbosch;
2000–2002: Ad hoc Judge at the International Court of Justice in the Yerodia case;

Judge at the International Criminal Tribunal for the former Yugoslavia, 2003–2009
2003–2005: Ad litem Judge at the International Criminal Tribunal for the former Yugoslavia;
From 17 November 2005 (term till 2009): Permanent Judge at the International Criminal Tribunal for the Former Yugoslavia.

Judge of the International Criminal Court, 2009–2018
In March 2012, the Presidency of the ICC announced that Van Den Wyngaert and her fellow judges Kuniko Ozaki and Chile Eboe-Osuji would form Trial Chamber V, which was responsible for the prosecutor's investigation in Kenya. By April 2013, Van Den Wyngaert asked to be excused from hearing a crimes-against-humanity case against Uhuru Kenyatta and William Ruto after questioning the conduct of the prosecution under Fatou Bensouda.

When Congolese warlord Germain Katanga was convicted in March 2014 of being an accessory to one count of crime against humanity and war crimes including murder and pillage – only the second conviction in the 12-year history of the ICC –, Van den Wyngaert partially disagreed with her two fellow judges Fatoumata Dembele Diarra and Bruno Cotte. In her dissenting opinion, she argued Katanga's trial had lasted too long and that he should have been acquitted in 2013 along with his co-accused Mathieu Ngudjolo. She also held that Katanga was not intentionally responsible for the crimes and said it was unfair to convict him as an accessory when he had originally been charged with being central to the crimes' commission.

In June 2014 she wrote a dissenting opinion during the pre-trial of the case The Prosecutor v. Laurent Gbagbo and Charles Blé Goudé, holding she was unable to join her colleagues in their decision to confirm the charges against Laurent Gbagbo and that in her view that the evidence was still insufficient.

Other activities
Van den Wyngaert is on the steering committee for The Crimes Against Humanity Initiative, which was launched in 2008 to study the need for a new comprehensive global convention on the prevention and punishment of crimes against humanity.

She has also served as rapporteur for the International Law Association on extradition and human rights and a general reporter for the Association Internationale de Droit Pénal in Budapest relating to international cooperation to combat organized crime.

Recognition
2001: doctor honoris causa at the University of Uppsala;
2006: Human Rights prize from Liga voor Mensenrechten.
2009: doctor honoris causa at the University of Brussels (2009).

References

Bibliography
A list of publications by Van Den Wyngaert up to 2004 is enclosed in CV Judge Van den Wijngaert at the Foreign Affairs Belgium website.

As author
 Van Den Wyngaert, C. Political Offence Exception to Extradition: The Delicate Problem of Balancing the Rights of the Individual and the International Public Order. Kluwer Academic, 1980, .
(In Dutch:) Van Den Wyngaert, C. Strafrecht en strafprocesrecht in hoofdlijnen. 1991. 11th revised edition: Strafrecht en strafprocesrecht in hoofdlijnen. Gompel&Svacina, 2019, .

As (co-)editor
 Van Den Wyngaert, C. et al. Criminal procedure systems in the European Community. Butterworths, 1993, .
 Van Den Wyngaert, C. et al. International Criminal Law and Procedure. Dartmouth - Ashgate, 1996, .
 Van Den Wyngaert, C. et al. International Criminal Law: A Collection of International and European Instruments. Brill Academic Publishers,
1996,  (description at Alibris);
2000, ;
2005, .

Further reading
 University of Antwerp website: Criminal law/international criminal law - C. Van den Wyngaert - Current research topics.

1952 births
Living people
21st-century Belgian judges
Belgian baronesses
20th-century Belgian lawyers
International Criminal Court judges
International Criminal Tribunal for the former Yugoslavia judges
Vrije Universiteit Brussel alumni
Scholars of criminal law
International law scholars
International criminal law scholars
Academic staff of the University of Antwerp
International Court of Justice judges
Belgian women judges
Belgian judges of United Nations courts and tribunals
Belgian judges of international courts and tribunals
Women legal scholars
Judges of the Kosovo Specialist Chambers
21st-century women judges